Gurab-e Lishavandan (also Romanized as Gūrāb-e Līshāvandān; also known as Gūrāb-e Lashāvandān) is a village in Molla Sara Rural District, in the Central District of Shaft County, Gilan Province, Iran. At the 2006 census, its population was 1,303, in 344 families.

References 

Populated places in Shaft County